Thomas Ian Nicholas (born July 10, 1980) is an American film actor, film producer and singer. Nicholas is best known for playing Henry Rowengartner in Rookie of the Year, Walt Disney in Walt Before Mickey and Kevin Myers in the American Pie film series. He starred in the 2021 film Adverse with Mickey Rourke.

Early life
Nicholas was born in Las Vegas, Nevada. His mother, Marla, was a professional dancer and an acting school administrator.

Acting
Nicholas is known for his roles in Rookie of the Year (1993) and American Pie (1999). He appeared in the four theatrical films of the American Pie franchise, as the character Kevin Myers, played Mitchel in the Roger Avary-directed The Rules of Attraction, played Frank Sinatra, Jr. in the Showtime movie Stealing Sinatra, and co-starred in Halloween: Resurrection. In 2009, he played the role of a rookie cop in the drama Life Is Hot in Cracktown. with Lara Flynn Boyle.

Nicholas played Eugene in the supporting cast of Nicole Holofcener's film Please Give, which won the 2010 Independent Spirit Robert Altman Award, given to the ensemble cast. He had the role of Abbie Hoffman in the film The Chicago 8. He also appeared on an episode of ABC's Grey's Anatomy as Jeremiah. In 2015, Nicholas appeared in Walt Before Mickey, where he portrays a young Walt Disney during the struggles of his early life and career. He was also a series regular on Steven Spielberg's TV drama series Red Band Society.

Nicholas is the lead actor in the Lionsgate film Adverse, opposite Mickey Rourke, Sean Astin, Lou Diamond Phillips and Penelope Ann Miller. The film was released in February 2021.

Music
Nicholas self-released his debut album, Without Warning, on January 15, 2008, and his follow-up album, "Without Warning Acoustic" on February 28, 2009. His third release was Heroes Are Human, put out on June 1, 2010. His fourth release is a self-titled EP, released March 20, 2012; the first single "My Generation" also appears as part of the American Reunion soundtrack album. His fifth release is the EP Security released on April 8, 2014.

In March 2015, Nicholas appeared on Blues Traveler's album Blow Up the Moon, co-writing the song "All the Way."

On July 9, 2022, Nicholas released "1999", a single that parodied the Bowling for Soup song "1985".

Personal life
Nicholas married Colette Marino, known as DJ Colette, in 2007. The couple had their first child, a son, in 2011. Their second child, a daughter, was born in April 2016. In May 2022, Colette filed for divorce from Nicholas.

Filmography

Films

Television

Music videos

References

External links
 
 
 

1980 births
Living people
Male actors from Las Vegas
American male child actors
American male film actors
American film producers
American people of English descent
American people of German descent
American people of Irish descent
American people of Italian descent
American male television actors
People from the Las Vegas Valley
Guitarists from Nevada
American male guitarists
21st-century American singers
21st-century American guitarists
21st-century American male singers
American rock guitarists